Tua Pek Kong (Tâi-lô: Tuā-peh-kong) is a Taoist deity in the pantheon of Peranakan folk religion practiced by ethnic Chinese in Malaysia, Singapore, and parts of Indonesia.

Throughout Southeast Asia, Tua Pek Kong is referred as the "God of Prosperity", where he is thought to be an incarnation of the god "Fu" from the trio of "Fu Lu Shou" representing "Prosperity, Fortune and Longevity" or a sailor from Fujian who sacrificed himself for a fellow human.

Background 
One of the prominent Tua Pek Kong was named Zhang Li from the Hakka clan. His Indonesian Sumatra-bound boat was struck by wind and accidentally landed on Penang Island in present-day Malaysia, which at that time had only 50 inhabitants. He is believed to have arrived in the island 40 years earlier than Francis Light in 1746. After his death, the local people began worshipping him and built the Tua Pek Kong Temple there where he was buried behind the Sea Pearl Island Tua Pek Kong Temple in Tanjung Tokong. The story of the first Tua Pek Kong in Penang demonstrates the tradition of sworn brotherhood between the Chinese diaspora:

Since then, he has been worshipped by Malaysian Chinese throughout the country. Tua Pek Kong is often mistaken for Tu Di Gong, partially because of their physical similarities. Between 1865 until 1868, Chung Keng Quee was a principal donor to the Haichu-yu (Sea Pearl) Tua Pek Kong Temple in Tanjung Tokong, Penang.

Temples 
The oldest and the first Tua Pek Kong Temple in Malaysia is located in Tanjung Tokong, Penang which was established in a fishing village no later than 1792 that eventually sprouts the worship of Tua Pek Kong throughout West Malaysia, Singapore, East Malaysia and parts of Indonesia. In the foot of Bukit Cina (Chinese Hill) in Malacca City, the Poh San Teng Temple is dedicated to Tua Pek Kong. In Sarawak of East Malaysia, there is around 76 known Tua Pek Kong temples scattered throughout every Chinese settlement in the state; some of the famous temples is the Tua Pek Kong Temple, Kuching, the Tua Pek Kong Temple in coastal Miri which is built after an epidemic in the town, and the Tua Pek Kong Temple, Sibu with its 7-storey pagoda that has become one of the landmark for Sibu. In Batam of Indonesia, one of its notable Tua Pek Kong Temple is located in Nagoya, while in Singapore its most notable Tua Pek Kong temples is located in Balestier, Loyang, Kusu Island and Ubin.

See also 
 Ancestor worship
 Chinese mythology
 Fengshui
 Shenism in Southeast Asia
 Malaysian folk religion
 Kusu Island

References 

Asian gods
Religion in Malaysia
Malaysian legends
Hakka culture in Singapore